Door Creek (also Buckeye, Deer Creek) is an unincorporated community located in the town of Cottage Grove, Dane County, Wisconsin, United States.

Notable people
Isaac Adams lived in Door Creek. He was a farmer and a member of the Wisconsin State Assembly.

Notes

Unincorporated communities in Dane County, Wisconsin
Unincorporated communities in Wisconsin